Cristiano Luís Rodrigues or simply Asprilla (born 4 May  1981), is a Brazilian central defender. He currently plays for Figuieirense on loan from Botafogo.

Contract
Figueirense (Loan) 9 August 2007 to 31 December 2007
Botafogo 21 July 2005 to 20 July 2008

External links
 canalbotafogo.com
 sambafoot.com
 figueirense.com

1981 births
Living people
Brazilian footballers
Paulista Futebol Clube players
Goiás Esporte Clube players
Ankaraspor footballers
Brazilian expatriate footballers
Brazilian expatriate sportspeople in Turkey
Expatriate footballers in Turkey
Botafogo de Futebol e Regatas players
Figueirense FC players
Association football defenders